Lisa Elizabeth Wilcox (born April 27, 1964) is an American actress, and former model and designer. She is best known for her role as Alice Johnson in the A Nightmare on Elm Street sequels 4 (1988) and 5 (1989)—both box office successes. In 2023, she appeared as herself along with her son Ryan on the controversial reality television series MILF Manor on TLC.

Early life
Wilcox was born on April 27, 1964 in Columbia, Missouri. She graduated with a Bachelor of Arts degree at the University of California, Los Angeles.

Career
In 1984, Wilcox made her film debut in Gimme an 'F'. From 1985 to 1987, Wilcox guest starred on the television series Hardcastle and McCormick (1985), You Again? (1986), CBS Schoolbreak Special (1987), Valerie's Family: The Hogans (1987), Mr. Belvedere (1987), and MacGyver (1987). In 1988, Wilcox guest starred on the television series It's a Living and Hotel before portraying Alice Johnson in the fantasy horror film A Nightmare on Elm Street 4: The Dream Master. In 1989, Wilcox had a recurring role on Knots Landing as Ellen and guest starred on Something Is Out There before reprising her role as Alice in A Nightmare on Elm Street 5: The Dream Child. The same year, Wilcox portrayed Yuta in an episode of Star Trek: The Next Generation called "The Vengeance Factor".

In 1992, Wilcox was cast as Missy Preston in the short lived television series Bill & Ted's Excellent Adventures. From 1993 to 1995, Wilcox had guest roles on Boy Meets World. From 1997 to 1998, Wilcox had guest roles on Pacific Blue (1997), Walker, Texas Ranger (1998), and Chicago Hope (1998). The same year, Wilcox starred alongside Mark Hamill in Watchers Reborn. In 1997, Wilcox starred alongside Will Ferrell in the comedy film Men Seeking Women. In 2000, Wilcox portrayed Florence Henderson in Unauthorized Brady Bunch: The Final Days and Chastity Blade in the short film The All New Adventures of Chastity Blade. 

In 2007, Wilcox appeared in 3 episodes of Big Shots. The following year, Wilcox was cast in Dead Country. In 2009, Wilcox portrayed Nurse Owens in the FEARnet produced webseries Fear Clinic for which she was nominated for the 2010 Streamy Awards. She starred alongside Robert Englund and Danielle Harris. In 2013, she starred in the thriller film Imago under the direction of Chris Warren, alongside actors such as Natalie Jones, Danielle Jones, Melanie Donihoo, Parrish Randall and Debbie Rochon. In 2015, Wilcox portrayed Pam Laudenslager in A Place Called Hollywood. In 2018, she portrayed Joan Laurels in the horror film The Church and is set to star in the sequel The Church: Second Offering. 

Wilcox appeared on Ken Reid's TV Guidance Counselor podcast on July 20, 2016. Wilcox is set to star in the upcoming films: The Watcher of Park Ave, The Quite Room, The Possessed, and Kecksburg.

In 2023, Lisa appeared with her son on MILF MANOR.

Personal life
In 2000, Wilcox and A Nightmare On Elm Street 4 co-star Tuesday Knight founded a footwear jewellery retailer company called ToeBrights which is still in business today.

Filmography

References

External links

 Official website

1964 births
American film actresses
American soap opera actresses
American television actresses
Actresses from Missouri
Living people
Actors from Columbia, Missouri
20th-century American actresses
21st-century American actresses
Artists from Columbia, Missouri
University of California, Los Angeles alumni